The men's 12.5 km long distance competitions in biathlon of the 2011 IPC Biathlon and Cross-Country Skiing World Championships were held on April 10, 2011.

Medals

Results

Sitting 
The men's 12.5 km, sitting. Skiers compete on a sitski.

Final

Standing 
The men's 12.5 km, standing.

Final

Visually impaired 
In the men's 12.5 km, visually impaired, skiers with a visual impairment compete with a sighted guide. Dual medals are rewarded.

Final

References

2011 IPC Biathlon and Cross-Country Skiing World Championships Live results, and schedule at ipclive.siwidata.com
WCH - Khanty Mansiysk - Results - Biathlon Long, IPC Nordic Skiing

Long distance